Hiroshi Miyamura High School is a high school in Gallup, New Mexico, United States. Formerly known as Gallup Junior High School, it was renamed Miyamura High School in 2007 as part of the Gallup-McKinley County Schools’ plan to create a second high school to serve Gallup, and was renovated from 2008 to 2010. The school's location was the site of the old Gallup High School campus from 1962 to 1998, before the latter moved to Gallup's west side.  Miyamura High School is named after Korean War hero and Medal of Honor recipient, Hiroshi H. Miyamura.

Attendance boundary
Miyamura draws students from the eastern side of Gallup, while Gallup High School draws students from the western side of Gallup. However, it is not uncommon to see students switch schools.

In addition to portions of Gallup, its boundary includes Chi Chil Tah, Church Rock, Fort Wingate, Jamestown, Rehoboth, Sagar, and Vanderwagen, as well as most of Catalpa Canyon.

Athletics and activities

The school colors are purple and silver, based on the colors of the Purple Heart.

Miyamura High School contains various clubs which students join and participate in.  These include the Business Professionals of America, FCA, MESA, FCCLA, and Skills USA.

References

Public high schools in New Mexico
Gallup, New Mexico
Schools in McKinley County, New Mexico
Educational institutions established in 2007
2007 establishments in New Mexico